Richwood is a village in Union County, Ohio, United States. The population was 2,229 at the 2010 census.

History

Early history, 1820–1860
Union County was organized on January 10, 1820 from territory previously contained in Franklin, Madison, Logan and Delaware Counties. Claibourne Township was surveyed by Richard Claiborne in 1811, and at that time the land was mostly level with some light rolling. He described the soil as 'argillaceous' with a thick tree growth. The first settler in Claiborne Township was Cyprian Lee, who with Henry Swartz took the contract to build the township's first road in 1825. This north to south road passed through what would become Richwood.

In 1832, two  land grants in Union County were received by William Pelham and Charles Blagrove of Virginia. Mr. Pelham sold his land to Mr. Blagrove that same year who promptly gave his nieces, Catherine and Parthenia Blagrove of Washington, D.C., the two parcels. Richwood would later be laid out on Parthenia's parcel. Miss Blagrove put her legal affairs in the hands of Delaware attorney George Bomford, who sold the land to Philip Plummer.

Philip Plummer was originally from Mt. Vernon, but he had been impressed with Union County's tree growth and rich soil. Once he had purchased Miss Blagrove's plat he returned with his brother Thomas, who was a surveyor. Together they found that the level ground and distance from Marysville, the county seat, would make that location desirable for a city. The town of Richwood was laid out August 8,9,10  1832 by Philip, his brother Thomas and Union County Surveyor Levi Phelps, who aided the project with 'interested and able support' and whose office recorded the first boundary lines for the new town.

Plummer donated some lots for public property to be used for specific purposes under specific conditions. Lots 13 and 60 on Franklin Street were to be the first and second fire companies, though they had to comprise 50 or more persons each and own either an engine and hose or buckets and ladders. Lot 44 was to be a public library, which had to have a board of trustees and 200 volumes of 'useful and miscellaneous publications'. Lot 100 was to be a museum, lots 117 and 118 for mayor or town council, lots 137 and 138 for a marketplace, lots 122, 123, 142 and 143 for common schools, outlot 5 for a church and outlot 14 for a botanical garden. The year before Richwood was incorporated, Ohio State Legislature passed an act that returned the ownership of these lots to Philip Plummer and his heirs.

The first building in Richwood was a one-room log cabin occupied by Dr. John P. Brookins and his family. It stood on lot No. 97, at the southwest corner of Franklin and Ottawa streets. Dr. Brookins was a friend of Philip's from Mt. Vernon and had been looking for a place to practice his medicine. For many years, he was the only doctor in Richwood and served as Justice of the Peace and as Postmaster. The cabin had one door, two windows, a puncheon floor, clapboard roof, and a scutched (smoothed) interior. The first death in Richwood was Dr. Brookins' daughter Jane Mary, who died of severe burns when her clothes caught fire. Two versions of the story exist; one being that she had been sitting too close to the hearth, and the other being that she got too close to a log-burning. His family also saw the town's first wedding.

The second cabin in Richwood was built by blacksmith Absolom Carney on the corner of East Bomford and Franklin Streets. His cabin had two rooms, the larger of which was for his blacksmithing shop. He mainly sharpened tools and shoed horses.

The boy, W.H. Frank, built the third cabin for a home for his widowed mother. Frank's father had died when he was 7 years of age. Frank lived with Mr. Baker Plummer, a brother of Phillip Plummer, when he was 10 years old. The man owned a hotel, the stage house, in Mt. Vernon. W.H. Frank worked for him as a chore boy and carefully saved up the money he earned. He later went to live with Dr. John P. Brookins, as a recommendation from Mr. Baker Plummer. Frank lived with the Doctor and his family and came with him to Richwood in 1832. Frank bought a lot from Philip Plummer and talked with him about building his own cabin. A man named Andrew, who lived 2 miles southwest of Richwood on Fulton Creek, helped the boy by building his cabin in exchange for Frank's watch, pig and a little sum of money.

Shoemaker John T. Evans of Dayton was the person who built the fourth cabin near the center of town, using timber on his property to make 'shoe-maker lasts' for boots and shoes that he sold at market in nearby communities. He was a well-liked individual, and as a result his shop became a popular gathering place.

In 1834 Richwood got its first established business, a grocery store opened by Burdick & Calloway. That same year the Methodist Episcopal Church in town formed a meeting society.

Several more families moved to Richwood from 1833–1934, some being William Phillips, a teacher who brought his family of eight children; John Wood, a tailor; John Wilson, a carpenter; Christian Goul, a shoemaker that stayed but a year; Nathan Richardson, a carpenter; Adam Burge, a 'Thomsonian' doctor who lived on lot 105 and left in short time; William Price, John T. Evans, who made shoes and boots, was benched in Burdick & Calloway's store and left after a year; and Henry Sayer, who began building a cabin on Franklin Street but moved west before it was completed. Thomas Plummer, the principal surveyor that platted Richwood, built a residence at 17 Franklin Street. After he left Richwood the Plummer house was used for lodging.

In 1834, road work was completed, and all the roads going into the town were gravelled.

The Methodist Episcopal Church was formally organized on October 17, 1835 by Reverend William Frazell, who served as an itinerant minister. William Phillips served as the first class leader; he was elected as the first Steward of the Richwood Circuit. The first church building was a hewn log cabin with a plowed and grooved floor.

Richwood was incorporated as a village in March 1835, and by 1840 twenty-five families were listed as living in Richwood. As of 1877, the town contained one newspaper, two banks, three churches, one brick school-house, and several stores and factories.

Current Businesses
Richwood is home to several businesses.

One of the oldest businesses is Richwood Bank. In May 1876, The Bank of Richwood was established at 116 N. Franklin Street. Then, in 1906, the bank was incorporated with $35,000 and made its first name change to The Richwood Banking Company. In this year, the newly renamed bank also found a new location at the corner of North Franklin and East Blagrove, where it sits today.

Before the Great Depression, there were three banks in Richwood. They included The Farmers Deposit Bank, The First National Bank of Richwood, and The Richwood Banking Company. The Great Depression brought on many struggles for the banking industry and The Richwood Banking Company was the only bank in Richwood to survive.

In the 1970s, the company started to expand beyond Richwood. In 1976, the bank's capital was $300,000, surplus was $800,000, and total assets amounted to $18 million. As of 2017, the bank has branches in Richwood, LaRue, Marysville, Huntsville, Plain City, and Delaware.

Geography
Richwood is located at  (40.426927, -83.297404).

Richwood is at the junction of Ohio State Routes 37 and 47.

Demographics

2010 census
As of the census of 2010, there were 2,229 people, 877 households, and 572 families residing in the village. The racial makeup of the village was 98.3% White, 0.4% African American, 0.2% Native American, 0.1% from other races, and 0.9% from two or more races. Hispanic or Latino of any race were 0.7% of the population.

There were 877 households, of which 40.6% had children under the age of 18 living with them, 45.7% were married couples living together, 13.3% had a female householder with no husband present, 6.2% had a male householder with no wife present, and 34.8% were non-families. 29.6% of all households were made up of individuals, and 14.1% had someone living alone who was 65 years of age or older. The average household size was 2.54 and the average family size was 3.14.

The median age in the village was 34.2 years. 29.6% of residents were under the age of 18; 7.5% were between the ages of 18 and 24; 28.2% were from 25 to 44; 22% were from 45 to 64; and 12.7% were 65 years of age or older. The gender makeup of the village was 47.4% male and 52.6% female.

2000 census
As of the census of 2000, there were 2,156 people, 849 households, and 567 families residing in the village. The population density was 1,795.2 people per square mile (693.7/km). There were 957 housing units at an average density of 796.9 per square mile (307.9/km). The racial makeup of the village was 97.96% White, 0.23% African American, 0.14% Native American, 0.09% Asian, 0.19% from other races, and 1.39% from two or more races. Hispanic or Latino of any race were 0.32% of the population.

There were 849 households, out of which 35.8% had children under the age of 18 living with them, 52.5% were married couples living together, 11.0% had a female householder with no husband present, and 33.1% were non-families. 28.2% of all households were made up of individuals, and 15.8% had someone living alone who was 65 years of age or older. The average household size was 2.54 and the average family size was 3.12.

In the village, the population was spread out, with 29.3% under the age of 18, 7.9% from 18 to 24, 29.3% from 25 to 44, 19.4% from 45 to 64, and 14.1% who were 65 years of age or older. The median age was 33 years. For every 100 females there were 90.1 males. For every 100 females age 18 and over, there were 87.6 males.

The median income for a household in the village was $39,550, and the median income for a family was $47,656. Males had a median income of $33,393 versus $21,971 for females. The per capita income for the village was $16,799. About 6.6% of families and 8.4% of the population were below the poverty line, including 9.0% of those under age 18 and 12.7% of those age 65 or over.

Education
Richwood is the home of the North Union Local School District. The North Union High School football team is known as the Wildcats.

Notable people
 Martha Root- teacher of the Baháʼí Faith
 Wallace Clement Sabine - inventor of the modern-day science of architectural acoustics
Gary Shirk - Former Professional football player for the New York Giants
 Todd Gibson - Former American Indy Car Racer

Gallery

References

Villages in Union County, Ohio
Villages in Ohio